The Hmar language or Khawsak ṭawng belongs to the Kukish branch of the Sino-Tibetan family of languages. The speakers of the language are also known as Hmar. According to the official 2011 Census of India, there are 29,268 Hmar/Khawsak speakers in Assam, 48,375 in Manipur, 1,700 in Meghalaya, 18,587 in Mizoram although Majority of the Hmars in Mizoram speak Duhlian (Mizo).

Hmar/Khawsak is a recognised language in the School curriculum of Assam, Manipur and Mizoram, and also recently recognised as one of the Modern Indian Language (MIL) at Manipur University. Board of Secondary Education, Assam has also included Hmar(Khawsak dialect) as an MIL in its matriculation syllabus from 2005. Both Manipur University and Assam University, Silchar has also permitted Khawsak Hmar language to be studied as Modern Indian Language in the Graduation level.

Geographical distribution
Khawsak dialect of Hmar is spoken in the following locations

Assam: Dima Hasao district (formerly North Cachar district), Karbi Anglong district, Barak Valley (Hailakandi district, Karimganj district  and Cachar district)
Manipur: Pherzawl district, Churachandpur district, Jiribam district, Imphal and Moreh
Mizoram: Aizawl district, Champhai district and Kolasib district
Tripura: In and around Darchawi and Jampui Hills
Meghalaya: Shillong and Khaddum village 
Myanmar: Tamu
Bangladesh: Bawm

Since Hmar speakers are scattered over a vast area in Mizoram, Manipur, Meghalaya, Tripura, Chittagong Hill tracts, North Carolina Hills and Cachar district of Assam state and Myanmar, there appears to be slight dialectal distinction. There is no homogeneous settlement of Hmar speakers alone. In Manipur, Hmar exhibits partial mutual intelligibility with the other Kukish dialects of the area including Thadou, Paite, Aimol, Vaiphei, Simte, Kom and Gangte languages.

References

External links
 VIRTHL-Ushering Change: News & Info House of the Hmars Visit Site 
Hmar Rûnpui : Hmar Social Networking Visit Site
Manipur Online The Unresolved Issues of the Hmar
Hmar.in
Hmarram.com
Sinlung News 

Kuki-Chin languages
Languages of Assam
Languages of Manipur
Languages of Mizoram
Endangered languages of India
Languages of Tripura
Hmar